Washington railway station served the town of Washington, Tyne and Wear, England from 1835 to 1963, initially on the Stanhope & Tyne Railway and later the Leamside line.

History 
The station was not conveniently located, being 1 mile to the south east of Washington Village with the station building located between the tracks of S&TR and DJR, immediately south of the junction between them. When the YN&BR diverted services onto the direct line to Pelaw, they began to use a new station in Washington, 600yd to north east of the original and only the market day services to Durham Turnpike continued to use the first station until they were withdrawn in December 1853.

The second station was situated on Station Road, south of the railway bridge and level crossing on Usworth Station Road and Washington Road respectively and was closer to Washington Village than the first station had been. Adjacent to the station were brickworks a wire rope works and a large chemicals plant. North of the footbridge were two buildings: one was the rear of a goods shed and the other was lower with a hipped roof. The goods shed was reached by the sidings on the up platform. The goods handled at the station were bricks, iron, steel, composition and livestock. 
However the opening of Chester-le-Street station on the Team Valley Line led to it being permanently withdrawn in January 1869. Inter-city services between London and  continued to use the line through Washington until 15 January 1872 when services were diverted via  and the Team Valley line after which point only local services used the Leamside line.

The passenger bookings had declined to a mere 2,318 in 1951. The Beeching Report recommended closing the station to passenger traffic, which occurred on 9 September 1963 (making it the first post-Beeching closure in the country). Goods continued to be handled at the station until 7 December 1964.

References 

Disused railway stations in Tyne and Wear
Former North Eastern Railway (UK) stations
Railway stations in Great Britain opened in 1850
Railway stations in Great Britain closed in 1963
1850 establishments in England
1963 disestablishments in England
Beeching closures in England